George Russell Strauss, Baron Strauss PC (18 July 1901 – 5 June 1993) was a long-serving British Labour Party politician, who was a Member of Parliament (MP) for 46 years and was Father of the House of Commons from 1974 to 1979.

Early life
Strauss was the son of the Conservative (and previously a Liberal Unionist) MP Arthur Strauss (1847–1920), who later joined the Labour Party. George Strauss was educated at Rugby School, where the hostile treatment experienced by him and other Jewish boys left him as a vehement supporter of racial equality. He became a metal merchant and a leading member of the London County Council, on which his wife Patricia also served.

Political career
Strauss' first parliamentary contest was in Lambeth North in 1924, when he lost by just 29 votes; however, he gained the seat in 1929. He lost it in Labour's landslide defeat of 1931, but regained it in a 1934 by-election. In 1939 Strauss was expelled from the Labour Party for seven months for supporting the 'Popular Front' movement of Stafford Cripps, whom he had served as Parliamentary Private Secretary.

Strauss was parliamentary secretary at the Ministry of Transport 1945–47 and was the Minister of Supply from 1947 to 1951. After boundary changes, he became MP for Vauxhall in 1950, which he represented until 1979. On 9 July 1979 he was created a life peer as Baron Strauss, of Vauxhall in the London Borough of Lambeth.

References

Bibliography
Times Guide to the House of Commons October 1974

External links 
George Strauss on Schoolnet
 
The Papers of George Strauss held at Churchill Archives Centre

1901 births
1993 deaths
English Jews
Jewish British politicians
Labour Party (UK) MPs for English constituencies
Labour Party (UK) life peers
Members of London County Council
Members of the Privy Council of the United Kingdom
Ministers in the Attlee governments, 1945–1951
Ministers of Supply
People educated at Rugby School
UK MPs 1929–1931
UK MPs 1935–1945
UK MPs 1945–1950
UK MPs 1950–1951
UK MPs 1951–1955
UK MPs 1955–1959
UK MPs 1959–1964
UK MPs 1964–1966
UK MPs 1966–1970
UK MPs 1970–1974
UK MPs 1974
UK MPs 1974–1979
Life peers created by Elizabeth II